"Somebody Like You" is a song co-written and recorded by Australian country music singer Keith Urban. It was released in July 2002 as the first single from his 2002 album Golden Road. The song became Urban's second number one hit on the US Billboard Hot Country Singles & Tracks (now the Hot Country Songs) chart, spending six weeks at that position. The song also peaked at number 23 on the Billboard Hot 100. In December 2009, Billboard also named the song as the number one country song of the first decade of the 21st century.

In 2003, this song was remixed for the film How to Lose a Guy in 10 Days.

Content
"Somebody Like You" is set in common time in the key of E major. The verses use a chord pattern of E-A-E-B-A-E, with a pattern of E-A-E-A-Cm-Fm7 on the chorus, and the lead vocal ranges from E4 to G5.

Commercial performance

"Somebody Like You" reached the number one position on the Billboard Hot Country Singles & Tracks (now the Hot Country Songs) chart dated for the week of October 19, 2002, holding that position for six weeks and spending forty-one weeks on that chart. It also reached number 23 on the all-genre Billboard Hot 100 chart.

In December 2009, Billboard ranked "Somebody Like You" as the number one country song for the first decade of the 21st century.  The song was certified Gold by the RIAA on June 13, 2005. As of September 2015, the song has sold 1.05 million copies in the US.

Music video
The song's music video was released to Country Music Television (CMT) on August 7, 2002. It was directed by Trey Fanjoy, who also directed the video for Urban's late 2000/early 2001 single "But for the Grace of God". Urban's ex-girlfriend, Niki Taylor appeared in the video.

Charts and certifications

Weekly charts

Year-end charts

Sales and certifications

Personnel
The following musicians perform on this track:

Keith Urban – lead vocals, lead guitar, ganjo, EBow, cardboard box
Tim Akers – keyboards
Tom Bukovac – rhythm guitar
Dann Huff – guitars
Chris McHugh – drums
Jimmie Lee Sloas – bass guitar
Russell Terrell – background vocals

References

2002 singles
Keith Urban songs
Music videos directed by Trey Fanjoy
Songs written by John Shanks
Song recordings produced by Dann Huff
Songs written by Keith Urban
Capitol Records Nashville singles
2002 songs